Family Demolition is a Canadian documentary film, directed by Patrick Damien-Roy and released in 2015. The film profiles Christopher and Marika, two teenage cousins from Bellechasse, Quebec, who are both involved in the sport of demolition derby.

The film premiered on September 19, 2015 at the Quebec City Film Festival, where it won the Public Award for Best Feature Film and the Prix Jury Cinéphile for Best First Film.

Catherine Legault won the Prix Iris for Best Editing in a Documentary at the 19th Quebec Cinema Awards in 2017.

References

External links 
 

2015 films
2015 documentary films
Canadian documentary films
EyeSteelFilm films
French-language Canadian films
2010s Canadian films